Fine harness is a type of driving competition seen at horse shows, that feature light, refined horses with high action.  Popular breeds in this event include the American Saddlebred, Morgan, Arabian, Dutch Harness Horse, and Hackney (horse).

Some breeds of pony are also shown in the fine harness style.  These include the Hackney Pony, Welsh pony, and the American-type Shetland Pony.

The harness used is a light, breastplate type without a horse collar.  The cart used is generally a light, four-wheeled design.   Drivers wear formal attire.

Horse driving